Shelby Forest can refer to either one of the following:

Shelby Forest, Tennessee, an unincorporated community in Shelby County, Tennessee
Meeman-Shelby Forest State Park, a state park adjacent to the community